Perdicella ornata is a species of tropical, tree-living, air-breathing, land snails, arboreal pulmonate gastropod mollusks in the family Achatinellidae.  This species is endemic to Hawaii in the United States.

References

O
Molluscs of Hawaii
Endemic fauna of Hawaii
Taxonomy articles created by Polbot